Turó de Tagamanent is a mountain of Catalonia, Spain. It has an elevation of 1,055 metres above sea level.

References

Mountains of Catalonia